Uwe Meierhenrich (born 23 October 1967 in Detmold) is a German Physico-Chemist. He is professor of Analytical and Physical Chemistry at the University of Nice Sophia Antipolis in France.

Academic life 
Meierhenrich was raised in a family of teachers and professors. He studied chemistry at the Philipps-University Marburg and obtained a Ph.D. degree in physical chemistry at the University of Bremen by Thiemann. He did postdoctoral work at the Max Planck Institute for Solar System Research in Katlenburg-Lindau and at the French Synchrotron Center LURE. In 2003 he earned his habilitation with the publication of The Origin of Biomolecular Asymmetry at the University of Bremen. In 2005 he was hired as a professor at the University of Nice Sophia Antipolis in France. For his work on chirality, he was awarded the Horst-Pracejus-Prize of the Gesellschaft Deutscher Chemiker (German Chemical Society) in 2011.

Career 
Meierhenrich was hired by the European Space Agency to develop instrumentation for its Rosetta mission to 67P/Churyumov–Gerasimenko. The purpose of the instrumentation was to detect organic compounds on the comet's surface. To test it on Earth, he worked with scientists at Leiden University in the Netherlands who were making artificial cometary ice. They replicated the conditions in space, creating a cold vacuum and bombarding the ice with ultraviolet light. They succeeded in synthesizing 16 amino acids. When the Rosetta spacecraft reached 67P in 2014, it detected similar organic compounds in the comet. In further experiments at his lab in Nice, he analyzed cometary ice analogs with multidimensional gas chromatography and detected ribose, one of the sugars that make up DNA.

Further experiments at the French SOLEIL synchrotron showed that life's homochirality can also originate under interstellar conditions.

Publications 

</ref>

References

External links 
 Homepage at the Faculty of Sciences at the University of Nice Sophia Antipolis
 CNRS press release 2002

German physical chemists
Living people
1967 births
People from Detmold